Xerocomellus dryophilus, commonly known as the oak-loving bolete and formerly known as Boletus dryophilus or Xerocomus dryophilus, is a basidiomycete fungus in the family Boletaceae native to North America. It appears to only occur under the coast live oak (Quercus agrifolia), and is only found in California, where it is one of the most common boletes in the Los Angeles and San Diego counties.

It was transferred to the new genus Xerocomellus in 2014.

This epithet had been previously applied to a European species, now described as Xerocomellus redeuilhii.

References

External links

Boletaceae
Fungi of North America
Fungi described in 1975